The Laredo Law was a 2004 af2 expansion team, the minor league for the Arena Football League.  They played their home games at the Laredo Entertainment Center in Laredo, Texas.  They only played for one season (for a 3-13 record) before ceasing all operations at the end of the season.

The team's head coach was Scott Maynard, son of Don Maynard, who starred for the New York Jets as wide receiver and is a member of the Pro Football Hall of Fame.

Arena Football would not return to Laredo, Texas until 2006, when the Laredo Lobos were formed for the Intense Football League.  Now, the Lobos are in the AF2.

Season-By-Season

|-
|2004 || 3 || 13 || 0 || 5th NC Southwestern || --
|}

2004 Laredo Law Roster
1  Roque Vela
2  Traco Rachal
3  Terrance Minor
4  Marc Saldana
4  Rich Lucero
5  James Dawson
7  P.J. Winston
8  Julius Brown
10 Michael Wakefield
11 Trey Merkens
13 Brian Hegneur
14 Greg Bell
17 Rocky Perez
19 Bjay Jones
22 Melvin Phillips
25 Torrey Prather
34 Rod Kelly
55 Ariel Famaligi
70 Michael Patterson
73 Steve Mascorro
81 Mike Jones
92 Juwan Jackson
95 John Amarro
Head Coach: Scott Maynard
OL/DL Coach: Jim Beverly
Defensive Coordinator: Stan Petry
Special Teams: Coach Mark Soto
Trainer: Bobby Moore Jr.

External links
 Laredo Law on ArenaFan.com

Defunct af2 teams
Sports in Laredo, Texas
Defunct American football teams in Texas
American football teams established in 2003
American football teams disestablished in 2004
2003 establishments in Texas
2004 disestablishments in Texas